Basail Govinda Government High School is a secondary school in Basail Upazila, and one of five government high schools in Tangail District in the Division of Dhaka, Bangladesh.

In 1945, sons of Landlord Govinda Chandra Roy established this school in their father's memory who died circa 1908. The first headmaster of this school is Babu Bosonto Kumar Roy. At this time, the name of the school was ‘Basail Middle English School (বাসাইল মধ্য ইংরেজী বিদ্যালয়)’.  At the beginning, it was English medium school and the activities of the school was started at the Landlord house(Present Roy Bari at basail East para). In 1948 Charu Chandra Roy, Apurbo Chandra Roy and Saroj Bandhu Roy sons of Govinda Chandra Roy transferred the school to its present location. At this time, its name was changed to ‘Basail Govinda High English School’. In 1952, ‘English’ word was removed and the name of the school was changed to ‘Basail Govinda High School’. At this time, many students of the nearest upazila were admitted at his school. It was the famous school of the Basail upazila at this time.

At 6 November 1987, President Hossain Mohammad Ershad declared it as government school. Mahmud Almazidi (Shish Miah) was the upazila chairman at that time. He played an important rule to make it government school. The first headmaster of the government school was Miah MD. Abul Kashem.

The area of the school is 9 acres. The academic staffs of the school are 14. The school has about four hundred students.

The school published a yearly magazine named ‘ধ্রুবতারা’.

S.S.C Results

Headmasters List

References 

High schools in Bangladesh
Educational institutions established in 1945
1945 establishments in India
Schools in Tangail District